Nitro PDF Pro is an application used to create and edit Portable Document Format (PDF) files and digital documents.

History 
Nitro Software was founded in Melbourne, Australia, by a team of three, as an alternative PDF software to Adobe Acrobat.

In 2015, the company reported 1 million licenses sold. In 2018, it launched the Nitro Productivity and eSigning Suite.

In 2018, Nitro PDF Pro was used by more than 650,000 businesses. 

In June 2021, the company purchased PDFPen, a Mac, iPad, and iPhone PDF editing app.

Products 
Products include a PDF editor, a browser-based application for electronic signatures and PDF productivity tools. Subscription services include cloud-based user management, deployment and analytics tools. Nitro also manages several free document conversion sites. 

The company sunset their PDF reader, Nitro Reader, in 2017. It was claimed that "users can get the same functionality with an expired free trial of Nitro PDF Pro". That's not quite true, as several functions are disabled including a simple [Save/SaveAs] of an existing opened document. This can not only create additional workflow (re-download, re-direct:save) if the document was opened into the reader from an external source -- but in some cases (paywall, limited-articles, sign-up/subscribe, etc.) not just inconvenience the user but also impose additional actual costs or restrict access altogether.

Nitro's desktop products are available on Windows and Mac. Nitro Cloud is compatible with any web browser on any machine. Nitro PDF Pro is proprietary trialware, while Nitro Reader is freeware for both personal and professional use.

Nitro version history

See also 
 List of PDF software

References

External links 

Desktop publishing software
PDF readers
PDF software